K. Sornam (1933 – 8 June 2021) was an Indian journalist, writer and director who worked in Tamil cinema. He was active in the second half of the 1900s, and shared close associations with chief ministers of Tamil Nadu Karunanidhi and M. G. Ramachandran.

Film career 
Born in Thirukkuvalai, Sornam worked as a literary writer with his relative, Karunanidhi. He had a key role in the operations of the Dravida Munnetra Kazhagam's political newspaper, Murasoli. While at Murasoli, Sornam brought out the supplement Pudhayal, and also worked on archiving Karunanidhi's writings. In the 1960s, he worked on the theatrical play Vidai Kodu Thaaye (Bid Me Farewell Mother), a revolutionary play written to highlight the need for social reforms. For his script, he was presented with an award by C. N. Annadurai.

Sornam went on to enrol in film institute in Chennai, besides becoming the secretary of Tamil Eyal Isai Nadaga Manram, a theatre organisation. Sornam wrote the dialogues for 3 movies starring MGR, including Nam Naadu (1969), Adimai Penn (1969) and Ulagam Sutrum Valiban (1973). He also directed films with actors such as Sivakumar and Kamal Haasan in Thangathile Vairam (1975), R. Muthuraman's Seer Varisai (1976), and Jaishankar's Aasai Manaivi (1977).

In 1987, he directed the film Ore Raththam featuring Karthik in the lead role. The film has since garnered attention for marking the acting debut of politician M. K. Stalin. In the 1990s, Sornam was later the editor-in-charge for the magazine Ilaya Suriyan, that had been created by M. K. Stalin, and regularly served as the political party's voice.

Death 
Sornam died on 8 June 2021, aged 88, due to age-related ailments.

Partial filmography

References

External links 
 

1933 births
2021 deaths
20th-century Indian dramatists and playwrights
Film directors from Chennai
Place of birth missing
Screenwriters from Chennai
Tamil film directors
Tamil screenwriters